Mohammadabad-e Ayala (also Romanized as Moḩammadābād-e Āyʿalā; also known as Moḩammadābād and Moḩammadābād-e Pāzūkī) is a village in Valiabad Rural District, in the Central District of Qarchak County, Tehran Province, Iran. At the 2006 census, its population was 5,044, in 1,213 families.

References 

Populated places in Qarchak County